Thomas John Evans (born July 9, 1974 in Kirkland, Washington) is a former professional third baseman. Between 1997 and 2000, Evans played for the Toronto Blue Jays (1997–98) and Texas Rangers (2000). in Major League Baseball. He batted and threw right-handed.

Career
In a three-season career, Evans posted a .255 batting average with one home run and seven RBI in 42 games played. After his major league career, Evans played two seasons in Japan for the Hanshin Tigers and the Seibu Lions. He also played in the LVBP in Venezuela with the Cardenales de Lara. 
In , while playing for the Altoona Curve in the Pittsburgh Pirates organization, Evans received a 15-game suspension for violating Major League Baseball's minor-league drug treatment and prevention program.

References

External links

Pelota Binaria (Venezuelan Winter League)

1974 births
Living people
Altoona Curve players
American expatriate baseball players in Canada
American expatriate baseball players in Japan
American expatriate baseball players in Mexico
Baseball players from Washington (state)
American sportspeople in doping cases
Baseball players suspended for drug offenses
Cardenales de Lara players
American expatriate baseball players in Venezuela
Colorado Springs Sky Sox players
Dunedin Blue Jays players
Hagerstown Suns players
Hanshin Tigers players
Iowa Cubs players
Knoxville Smokies players
Major League Baseball third basemen
Mexican League baseball infielders
Medicine Hat Blue Jays players
Nippon Professional Baseball first basemen
Nippon Professional Baseball third basemen
Oklahoma RedHawks players
Olmecas de Tabasco players
Saraperos de Saltillo players
Seibu Lions players
Sportspeople from Kirkland, Washington
Syracuse SkyChiefs players
Texas Rangers players
Toledo Mud Hens players
Toronto Blue Jays players